The 2022–23 Southern Utah Thunderbirds women's basketball team represented Southern Utah University during the 2022–23 NCAA Division I women's basketball season. The Thunderbirds are led by fifth-year head coach Tracy Sanders and play their home games at America First Events Center. They are members of the Western Athletic Conference.

Roster

Schedule and results

|-
!colspan=9 style=| Non-conference regular season

|-
!colspan=9 style=| WAC regular season

|-
!colspan=9 style=| WAC Women's Tournament

|-
!colspan=9 style=| NCAA Women's Tournament

See also
 2022–23 Southern Utah Thunderbirds men's basketball team

References

2018-19 team
Southern Utah
2022 in sports in Utah
2023 in sports in Utah
Southern Utah